Madivaru as a place name may refer to:
 Madivaru (Kaafu Atoll) (Republic of Maldives)
 Madivaru (Lhaviyani Atoll) (Republic of Maldives)
 Madivaru (Dhaalu Atoll) (Republic of Maldives)
 Madivaru Airport, an airport on Madivaru, Lhaviyani Atoll, Maldives